Sergiu Plătică (born 5 June 1991) is a Moldovan footballer who plays as a forward for Petrocub Hîncești and the Moldova national team.

Club career
On 19 June 2017 he was loaned by his club Speranța Nisporeni to Milsami Orhei for the duration of Milsami's European campaign. On 29 June, he scored a goal in the Europa League qualifying game against CS Fola Esch. After the return leg on 6 July 2017, Milsami were eliminated by Fola, and he returned to Speranta before playing any national league games for Milsami and just two and a half weeks at the club.

He returned to Milsami Orhei on a permanent basis in January 2018.

International
He made his Moldova national football team debut on 17 January 2017 in a game against Qatar. That game was not an official FIFA-approved international game. He made his official national team debut on 6 October 2017 in a World Cup qualifier against Ireland.

Personal life
His older brother Mihai Plătică is also a football player.

Honours
Milsami Orhei
Moldovan Cup: 2017–18

Petrocub Hîncești
Moldovan Cup: 2019–20

References

External links
 
 
 

1991 births
Living people
Moldovan footballers
Moldova international footballers
Association football forwards
FC Sfîntul Gheorghe players
Speranța Nisporeni players
FC Milsami Orhei players
CS Petrocub Hîncești players
Moldovan Super Liga players